George Harmon may refer to:

 George Harmon (basketball) (1902–1954), American basketball player (Mercer Bears)
 George Harmon (footballer) (born 2000), English football player (Oxford City, Ross County)
 George M. Harmon (1837–1910), Connecticut Adjutant General